Aleksandr Malygin (born on 27 November 1979) is a former Russian footballer of Ukrainian descent who played as a defender.

Club career
He scored the first goal in the history of FC Rostov in the European club tournaments.

Personal life
His father Volodymyr Malyhin and his brother Yuriy Malyhin were both professional footballers as well.

External links
 Player`s profile
 Ukrainian Premier League statistics 2006–07 season

1979 births
Living people
Footballers from Luhansk
FC Mariupol players
FC Rostov players
Russian Premier League players
Simurq PIK players
FC Akhmat Grozny players
FC Ural Yekaterinburg players
FC SKA Rostov-on-Don players
FC Hoverla Uzhhorod players
FC Zorya Luhansk players
FC Torpedo Moscow players
Ukrainian Premier League players
Ukrainian footballers
Ukrainian expatriate footballers
Expatriate footballers in Russia
Russian footballers
Russian expatriate footballers
Expatriate footballers in Azerbaijan
Expatriate footballers in Ukraine
Russian people of Ukrainian descent
FC Rotor Volgograd players
Association football defenders